Mali Obomsawin is an Indigenous musician, scholar, and community organizer from Abenaki First Nation at Odanak. An award-winning bassist, vocalist, songwriter, and composer, Obomsawin is a cross-genre artist specializing in free-jazz, rock, and American roots music. Her debut solo album “Sweet Tooth” (2022) has received international acclaim. She has toured nationally and internationally with the Mali Obomsawin Sextet, her former band Lula Wiles, and as an accompanist. Obomsawin is also a founding member of the Wabanaki-led nonprofit Bomazeen Land Trust, where she currently serves as executive director.

Early life 
Obomsawin was born in Stratford, New Hampshire. She is an enrolled member of Abenaki First Nation at Odanak in Quebec, and of Sephardic Jewish Descent on her mother's side. She is the granddaughter of writer/activist Paul Goodman, and cousin of renowned Abenaki musician, filmmaker and activist Alanis Obomsawin.

Obomsawin grew up in Farmington, Maine, and began playing double bass at age ten. She was introduced to roots music early on through mentorship from traditional fiddler Steve Muise and attendance at Maine Fiddle Camp. She toured the Canadian Maritimes in high school with the Franklin County Fiddlers.

Education 
In 2013, Obomsawin enrolled at Berklee College of Music where she completed three semesters before transferring to Dartmouth College. She obtained dual degrees in comparative literature and government from Dartmouth in 2018.

Obomsawin is also an alumnus of the Acoustic Music Seminar in Savannah, GA (2017 and 2018), where she studied and performed with Bryan Sutton, Mike Marshall, Aoife O’Donovan, and Julian Lage.

Career

Music 
While at Berklee, Obomsawin joined folk-rock trio Lula Wiles in 2014, who would go on to tour extensively in the US, Canada, and Germany, receiving acclaim for their renowned three part harmony singing and innovative songwriting. Lula Wiles signed with Smithsonian Folkways Recordings in 2018 with whom they released three well-received recordings before disbanding in 2021.

An in-demand bassist in the Folk, Americana, and Jazz circuits, Mali has performed with Jake Blount, Lizzie No, Peter Apfelbaum, Taylor Ho Bynum, and Bill Cole's Untempered Ensemble. Obomsawin is also a member of The Julia Keefe Indigenous Big Band and Indigenous Performance Productions' Welcome To Indian Country. Other notable collaborations include a forthcoming album featuring Delbert Anderson and Pura Fé.

In 2021, she scored the forthcoming film "We Are The Warriors” and collaborated with Red Sky Performance, the Toronto Symphony Orchestra and Palaver Strings.

Obomsawin received Folk Alliance International's 2022 Rising Tide Award," which celebrates “a new generation of artists who embody the values and ideals of the folk community through their creative work, community role, and public voice.” Obomsawin also received the New England Foundation for the Arts' "New Work New England" award in 2022 to support her debut solo album.

Obomsawin's debut solo album, "Sweet Tooth," was released October 28, 2022 on Out Of Your Head Records to international acclaim, receiving praise from Jazz Times "album of the day" Financial Times “Critic’s Choice,” and The Guardian’s "Folk Album of the Month" for November 2022.

Community organizing 
Outside of her musical career, Obomsawin is a community organizer and advocate for Indigenous rights, environmental justice, and land back. In 2020, she began working with Sunlight Media Collective, a Wabanaki-driven media team who's work is focused on, "documenting and promoting stories at the intersection of environmental justice and Tribal sovereignty." Obomsawin has also worked as a consultant and educator for Racial Equity and Justice.

Her writing on Indigenous sovereignty and racial justice has been published in Smithsonian Folkways Magazine, National Performance Network, and The Boston Globe.

In 2020 Obomsawin co-founded Bomazeen Land Trust, a Wabanaki-led 501(c)3 nonprofit organization focused on land protection, Indigenous cultural transmission, education, and food sovereignty.

Discography 

As Mali Obomsawin Sextet

With Lula Wiles

Featured on

References 

1995 births
Musicians from Maine
Abenaki people
Berklee College of Music alumni
Dartmouth College alumni
Indigenous activists of the Americas
Indigenous musicians
American folk musicians
Living people